The 2007–08 South West Peninsula League season was the first in the history of the South West Peninsula League, a football competition in England, that feeds the Premier Division of the Western Football League. The league had been formed in 2007 from the merger of the Devon County League and the South Western League, and is restricted to clubs based in Cornwall and Devon. The Premier Division of the South West Peninsula League is on the same level of the National League System as the Western League Division One.

Premier Division

The Premier Division featured 18 teams which had played in other leagues the previous season.

Nine were from the South Western League: Bodmin Town, Falmouth Town, Launceston, Liskeard Athletic, Plymouth Parkway, St Blazey, Saltash Town, Tavistock and Torpoint Athletic.

Eight were from the Devon County League: Buckland Athletic, Cullompton Rangers, Dartmouth, Elburton Villa, Holsworthy, Ivybridge Town, Newton Abbot Spurs and Witheridge.

One club, Clyst Rovers, had played in the Western League Division One during 2006–07, and had transferred directly from that league.

There was no relegation from the league this season.

League table

Division One East
The Division One East featured 17 teams which had played in other leagues the previous season.

Eleven were from the Devon County League: Alphington, Appledore, Budleigh Salterton, Crediton United, Newton Abbot, Ottery St Mary, Plymstock United, Stoke Gabriel, Teignmouth, Totnes & Dartington and University of Exeter.

Three were from the Devon and Exeter League: Axminster Town, Exmouth Town and Okehampton Argyle.

Two were from the South Devon League: Buckfastleigh Rangers and Liverton United.

One other team: Galmpton United.

League table

Division One West
The Division One West featured 16 teams which had played in other leagues the previous season.

Nine were from the South Western League: Callington Town, Goonhavern Athletic, Millbrook, Newquay, Penryn Athletic, Penzance, Porthleven, St Austell and Wadebridge Town.

Three were from the Cornwall Combination: Hayle, Mousehole and Wendron CC United.

Three were from the East Cornwall League: Camelford, Dobwalls and Foxhole Stars.

One was from the Devon County League: Vospers Oak Villa.

League table

References

External links
South West Peninsula League

South West Peninsula League
10